Eighteam is a 2015 Spanish/Zambian documentary film written and directed by Juan Rodriguez-Briso. It is based on the true story of the Zambia national football team. The team are commonly known as Chipolopolo - the "copper bullets" and the film follows their journey from tragedy to glory.

Plot 
In the late 1980s and early 1990s, Chipolopolo were a very promising national football team and in the 1988 Olympic Games in Seoul they surprised the world, and thrashed Italy 4-0. Following this victory, they had their eyes on winning the Africa Cup of Nations trophy and qualifying for their first World Cup in 1994.

This was not meant to be. On 27 April 1993, a Zambian Air Force plane carrying the team, coaches and administrative staff, ditched into the Atlantic Ocean about 500 metres offshore from Libreville, Gabon. All passengers and crew, including 18 players, died in the accident. Chipolopolo's captain, Kalusha Bwalya was not aboard the ill-fated flight as he was in the Netherlands playing for PSV at that time and had made separate arrangements to make his own way to Senegal to take part in the match. Two other players, Charles Musonda and Johnson Bwalya also were not aboard. The Football Association of Zambia then put all their efforts into building a new team. The new team qualified for the 1994 Africa Cup of Nations and only lost to Nigeria in the final. Kalusha Bwalya, went on to become the national team coach and president of the Football Association of Zambia.

Eighteen years and 9 months later, Zambia won the 2012 Africa Cup of Nations in Gabon and Equatorial Guinea, with the finals taking place a short distance from the place of the 1993 crash. Zambia became African champions for the first time, beating the favourite Ivory Coast after a long penalty shoot-out.

The film's name is derived from the fact that 18 players perished in the crash, there were 18 penalties in the final and 18 years between the crash and the final match.

Release 
Eighteam premiered in Lusaka (Zambia) on the 50th anniversary of Zambia's independence. Since then, the film has been screened in several film festivals worldwide.

Awards

References

2015 films
2015 documentary films
English-language Spanish films
English-language Zambian films
2010s English-language films
Zambia national football team
Documentary films about association football
Zambian documentary films
Spanish sports films
Spanish documentary films